The 2008–09 Luge World Cup was a multi race competition over a season for luge. The season started on 29 November 2008 and ended on 21 February 2009. The World Cup was organised by the FIL and sponsored by Viessmann. These cups served as qualifiers for the 2010 Winter Olympics luge events in Vancouver.

Calendar

Standings

Men's singles

Doubles

Women's singles

References
FIL-Luge.org December 19, 2008 on number of athletes allowed to participate for the 2010 Winter Olympics in Vancouver. - accessed December 19, 2008.

Luge World Cup
2008 in luge
2009 in luge